Sakapultek  or Sacapulteco is a Mayan language very closely related to Kʼicheʼ (Quiché).  It is spoken by approximately  people in Sacapulas, El Quiché department and in Guatemala City.

References

External links
 The John William Dubois Collection Of Sacapultec Sound Recordings at the Survey of California and Other Indian Languages
Collections in the Archive of the Indigenous Languages of Latin America

Agglutinative languages
Mayan languages
Indigenous languages of Central America
Mesoamerican languages
Languages of Guatemala